Kingen is a lake on the border between Sweden and Norway. The Norwegian part is located in the municipality of Lierne in Trøndelag county, and the Swedish part is located in the municipality of Krokom in Jämtland County.  It lies south of the larger lake Rengen.

See also
List of lakes in Norway

References

Lierne
Lakes of Trøndelag
Lakes of Jämtland County
Norway–Sweden border
International lakes of Europe